Matthias Bachinger (born 2 April 1987) is a professional tennis player from Germany who turned professional in 2005. His career-high singles ranking is world No. 85, achieved in August 2011.

Professional career
In 2007, Bachinger qualified for his first ATP tournament, the 2007 BMW Open. Bachinger won in the first round against Andreas Beck 6–2, 7–6, 7–5 before losing to Marcos Baghdatis in the second round 6–7, 2–6, 4–6.

In 2008, Bachinger entered the ABN AMRO World Tennis Tournament, the BMW Open, the Austrian Open and the If Stockholm Open, losing in the first round in each event.

He then played only Challenger level tournaments before qualifying for the 2010 If Stockholm Open, where he reached the second round.

Bachinger reached his first ATP semifinal at the 2012 BRD Năstase Țiriac Trophy. He also reached the quarterfinals of Umag the same year, defeating seventh-seeded Martin Kližan en route.

In 2013, Bachinger defeated World No. 18 Andreas Seppi, for his first top 20 win.

In 2014, he recorded his first Major win as a qualifier at the 2014 US Open (tennis) defeating Radek Štěpánek. He also reached the semifinals in Stockholm as a qualifier.

In 2018, he reached his first ATP Tour final in Metz, again as a qualifier, after defeating Kei Nishikori in the semifinals, before losing to Gilles Simon.

Playing style
Bachinger has an unusual take-back and swing on his forehand and backhand. He has solid groundstrokes, with both sides capable of producing winners. He has a good serve that can reach up to 127 mph (204 km/h). He is very strong at the net and frequently rushes to the net. He frequently serve-and-volleys and uses the chip-and-charge tactic on returns.

Performance timelines

Singles
Current through the 2022 Australian Open.

Doubles

ATP career finals

Singles: 1 (1 runner-up)

Doubles: 1 (1 runner-up)

ATP Challenger and ITF Futures finals

Singles: 22 (6–16)

Doubles: 9 (5–4)

Record against top-10 players
Bachinger's match record against players who have been ranked world No. 10 or higher is as follows. Only ATP Tour main draw are considered.

 Radek Štěpánek 1–0
 Fernando Verdasco 1–0
  Roberto Bautista Agut 1–1
 Kei Nishikori 1–1
 James Blake 0–1
 David Goffin 0–1
 Gaël Monfils 0–1
 Andy Murray 0–1
 Casper Ruud 0–1
 Mikhail Youzhny 0–1
 Tomáš Berdych 0–2
 Marin Čilić 0–2
 Gilles Simon 0–3
 Marcos Baghdatis 0–4

* .

References

External links 
 
 

1987 births
German male tennis players
People from Dachau (district)
Sportspeople from Upper Bavaria
Tennis players from Munich
Living people